Coccoloba cereifera is a rare species of flowering plant in the knotweed or buckwheat family Polygonaceae. The species is restricted to a single mountain, the Serra do Cipó, in southern Brazil. The species is notable for its expression of a trioecious sexual system.

References 

cereifera
Endemic flora of Brazil